Jai Whitbread (born 16 January 1998) is an Australian professional rugby league footballer who plays as a  and  for Wakefield Trinity in the Super League. 

He has previously played for the Gold Coast Titans in the NRL.

Background
Whitbread was born in Tugun, Queensland, Australia and raised in Tweed Heads, New South Wales.

He played his junior rugby league for the South Tweed Bears. He attended Saint Joseph's College, Tweed Heads and The Southport School before being signed by the Gold Coast Titans. He is the son of former Canterbury Bulldogs and Gold Coast Giants/Seagulls player, Greg Whitbread.

Playing career

Early career
In 2014, while a member of the Gold Coast Titans high performance squad, Whitbread represented the New South Wales Under-16 team. In 2016, he joined the Brisbane Broncos, playing for their Holden Cup (Under-20s) team and representing New South Wales Under-18s team.

2018
Whitbread began the season playing for the Burleigh Bears in the Queensland Cup.

In round 18 of the 2018 NRL season, Whitbread made his NRL debut for the Gold Coast against the Sydney Roosters.  This would be Whitbread's only top grade appearance for the club in 2018.  The Gold Coast would go on to finish in 14th position on the table at the end of the season.

2019
Whitbread made a total of 18 appearances for the Gold Coast in the 2019 NRL season as the club endured a horror year on and off the field.  During the halfway mark of the season, head coach Garth Brennan was sacked by the club after a string of poor results.  The Gold Coast managed to win only four games for the entire season and finished last claiming the Wooden Spoon.

2020
Whitbread played nine games for the Gold Coast in the 2020 NRL season as the club finished ninth on the table and missed the finals.

2021
On 2 August 2021, it was reported that he had signed for Leigh in the Super League.

Wakefield Trinity
On 24 Nov 2021 it was reported that he had signed for Wakefield Trinity in the Super League

References

External links
Gold Coast Tirans profile

1998 births
Living people
Gold Coast Titans players
Leigh Leopards players
People from Tweed Heads, New South Wales
Rugby league players from Queensland
Rugby league props
Wakefield Trinity players
Australian expatriate sportspeople in England